The City's Edge is a 1983 Australian film co-written by Aboriginal Australian writer Bob Merritt.

Plot
Andy comes to Sydney and falls in love with the sister of a heroin addict.

Production
The film was originally entitled Running Man and was never released theatrically in Australia although it was in the UK.

Merritt later claimed he preferred to "write off" the experience but says it gave him the track record to make Short Changed (1985).

References

External links

Australian drama films
1983 films
Films scored by Chris Neal (songwriter)
1980s English-language films
1983 drama films
1980s Australian films